Nazmul Huda Mintu (5 December 1942 - 2 June 2019) was a Bangladeshi film director. He directed many Dhallywood films.

Biography
Mintu was born on 5 December 1942 in Naogaon. He made his directorial debut in Dhallywood with Surjo Othar Age. He served as general secretary of Bangladesh Film Directors Association from 1989 to 1990. He was the director of Moushumi which film's title was named after Moushumi.

Mintu died in London on 2 June 2019 at the age of 76.

Selected filmography
 Surjo Othar Age
 Chowdhury Bari
 Dak Peon
 Moushumi
 Onek Prem Onek Jwala
 Diner Por Din
 Songhorsho
 Modhumaloti
 Ghore Baire

References

2019 deaths
Bangladeshi film directors
People from Naogaon District
1942 births